Radio Advertising Bureau may refer to:
Radio Advertising Bureau (UK)
Radio Advertising Bureau (US)